Wilfredo Gómez Rivera (born October 29, 1956), sometimes referred to as Bazooka Gómez, is a Puerto Rican former professional boxer and three-time world champion. He is frequently mentioned among the best Puerto Rican boxers of all time by sports journalists and analysts, along with Félix Trinidad, Miguel Cotto, Wilfred Benítez, Esteban De Jesús, Edwin Rosario, and Carlos Ortíz.

His seventeen consecutive knockouts in championship defenses as a junior featherweight is a record for all boxing divisions. He was ranked number 13 on The Ring magazine's list of the "100 greatest punchers of all time". In 1995, Gómez was inducted into the International Boxing Hall of Fame.

Biography
Gómez was born in a poor area of Las Monjas of Hato Rey in San Juan, Puerto Rico, the son of Jacobo Gómez and Julia Rivera. Gómez himself reportedly used a bicycle as means of transportation when he was young, and he sold candy to earn pocket money before becoming an amateur boxer.

Amateur career and professional debut
Gómez won the gold medal at the 1974 Central American and Caribbean Games held in Santo Domingo, Dominican Republic, and 1974 World Championships in Havana, Cuba before turning professional. He also competed in the 1972 Olympic Games in Munich, Germany, getting eliminated by an Egyptian rival in the Olympic's first round of bouts. He compiled an overall record of 96 wins and 3 defeats as an amateur boxer. Because of his family's economic situation, he decided not to wait for the 1976 Olympic Games in Montreal, Quebec, Canada, opting to begin making money right after the 1974 World Amateur Boxing championship instead. Coming from Puerto Rico, he settled for less money and exposure from the American media, and moved to Costa Rica, where he began to tour all of Central America in hopes of finding matches. His professional debut came in Panama City, Panama, where he fought to a draw with Jacinto Fuentes.

Professional career
After this inauspicious debut, he reeled off a streak of 32 consecutive knockouts including wins over Fuentes, who was dispatched in 2 rounds in a rematch, and future world champion Alberto Davila, who lasted 9 rounds before being defeated. His 32 consecutive knockouts place him in a third place tie with Deontay Wilder and  behind LaMar Clark (44) and Billy Fox (43) for the all-time knockout streak.

Gómez's knockout streak caught the eye of the WBC and Lineal Super Bantamweight champion Dong Kyun Yum of South Korea, who travelled to San Juan, Puerto Rico to defend his crown against Gómez. Yum had a promising start, dropping Gómez 30 seconds into the bout, but Gómez picked himself up and eventually won the crown, his first world title, with a 12th-round knockout. His second defense took him to Tokyo, where he beat former world champion Royal Kobayashi in three rounds.  Kobayashi had lasted 5 rounds vs Alexis Argüello. Next was Sagat Petchyindee in a small city of Thailand. He lasted two rounds. Petchyndee later became a world champion Thai and kick-boxer and famous actor in Thailand. The bout with Petchyndee was preceded by a large tragedy when a column collapsed inside the stadium before the evening's main event; ten people lost their lives and an estimated 300 were injured, but the contest's organizers nevertheless decided to continue with the day's boxing show. 

Gómez's streak reached 32 knockouts in a row, including what is generally considered to be his biggest victory ever, a five-round defeat of bantamweight champion Carlos Zárate, who was 55–0 with 54 knockout wins coming into their San Juan bout. Also included in that streak was future world champion Leo Cruz, beaten in 13 rounds at San Juan and Derrik Holmes, knocked out in five rounds in a fight attended, among others, by Sylvester Stallone, Carl Weathers and Alexis Arguello. After recording his 32nd. knockout win in a row, he moved up in weight to face the world featherweight champion Salvador Sánchez of Mexico.He lost to Salvador Sanchez by 8th-round TKO.

Hoping to get a rematch with Sanchez, Gómez went back to the super bantamweight division, where he got a dispense from the WBC to make two preparation bouts before defending his title again. He did so and won two non-title bouts, both by knockout in the 2nd round, one over Jose Luis Soto, who was a stablemate of Julio César Chávez back in Culiacán, Mexico. Wins over future world champ Juan 'Kid' Meza, knocked out in six in Atlantic City, and Juan Antonio Lopez, knocked out in ten as part of the Larry Holmes vs. Gerry Cooney undercard followed. But all chances of a rematch with Sanchez were dashed when Sanchez died in a car crash outside Mexico City the morning of August 12, 1982. Boxing fans across Latin America mourned the tragedy. Gómez, who was training to defend against Mexican Roberto Rubaldino only five days later, took a quick trip to Mexico to offer Sanchez flowers and then returned to Puerto Rico the same afternoon. He beat Rubaldino by knockout in 8 rounds and made one more title defense, against the Mexican bantamweight world champ Lupe Pintor in the Carnival of Champions in New Orleans, winning by knockout in 14 rounds. The Pintor contest was the only time a Gómez fight was showcased on HBO, which at the time exclusively showcased the largest boxing fights, much like the Pay Per View system does currently.

By the time he was done with the Junior Featherweights, Gómez had established a division record of 17 defenses, and a world record of most defenses in a row won by knockout, all his defenses finishing before the established distance limit.

Featherweight division

He then re-tried winning the Featherweight title and this time, he achieved his dream, winning his second world title by dethroning Juan Laporte, a fellow Puerto Rican who had won the title left vacant after Sanchez died. He beat Laporte by a 12-round unanimous decision. This time, however, he didn't enjoy a lengthy title reign. Ahead on all scorecards, Gómez was the victim of a rally by Azumah Nelson of Ghana who knocked him out in 11 rounds in San Juan, December 8, 1984.

Gómez wanted either a rematch with Nelson or a shot at WBA and Lineal Junior Lightweight world champion Rocky Lockridge of New Jersey, whichever came first. Lockridge was first to offer Gómez a try, and the 2 battled a closely scored 15 round bout in San Juan, with Gómez being given a majority 15-round decision, which many experts have said Lockridge deserved, but also which in the opinion of most who saw it live, was a justified decision.

Around this time, he began a shortly lived career as a boxing broadcaster. He specifically covered the Victor Callejas-Loris Stecca rematch from Italy for Puerto Rico's WAPA-TV, won by Callejas by sixth round technical knockout, and some local matches involving Alberto Mercado and Juan Carazo in Puerto Rico for Tele-Once.

This reign also came to an end quick, Gómez being handed his 3rd loss at the hands of young Alfredo Layne by knockout in 9 rounds. Layne lost the title in his own first defense to South Africa's Brian Mitchell, and it became obvious Gómez's best years had gone by, so he retired after this fight.

Last fights and retirement
Gómez tried a comeback in 1987 and 1989, but after winning 2 more bouts by knockout, he realized boxing wasn't in his heart anymore and retired for good. He later moved to Venezuela, where he ran into drug problems, causing him trouble with the law and spending some months in jail. He attended a rehabilitation center in Colombia. Gómez rebounded and is now back in Puerto Rico, where he has managed to stay off drugs. He helped Hector 'Macho' Camacho with the training of Camacho's son Héctor Camacho Jr., who was a boxer in the Jr Welterweight division. In 1998, Gómez became a born-again Christian.

On May 18, 2003, Gómez returned to Panama, where he was received by friends Roberto Duran and Eusebio Pedroza, among others. In a message geared towards Panamanians, he expressed thanks to that country, calling it his second country and saying, among other things "I'm very motivated now that I will return to Puerto Rico, and no one should be surprised if I buy an apartment in Panama and move my family here". However, he bought a house in Orlando, Florida in 2006.

Gómez had a record of 44 wins, 3 losses and 1 draw, with 42 knock out wins. In 1978, he was named Boxing Illustrated's fighter of the year. He is now a member of the International Boxing Hall of Fame. Gómez was voted as the Greatest Super Bantamweight Ever in 2014 by the Houston Boxing Hall Of Fame. The HBHOF is a voting body composed totally of current and former fighters.  In 2003 a biographical film entitled Bazooka: The Battles of Wilfredo Gómez was produced by Cinemar Films, the documentary was directed by Mario Diaz and was filmed in New York City.

Personal
Gómez has three daughters: Jennifer (who is Panamanian by birth), Gina and Liz Irina and one son, Wilfredo Junior. He is good friends with Panamanian boxing legend Roberto Durán. and former Puerto Rico Boxing Commissioner and boxing champion Victor Callejas.

Gómez declared that Fighting Harada was his idol as a child. 

Gómez is married to Carolina Gamboa.

On April 17, 2015, Gómez was arrested by Puerto Rican police after allegedly hitting his 59-year-old companion, a lady with whom he had been living for ten months. He was released after she refused to raise charges against him.

British boxer Michael Gomez adapted his last name from Armstrong to Gomez as a homage to Wilfredo, who was his childhood idol.

A biographical book about Gómez, written by author Christian Giudice and named "A Fire Burns Within", was released May 9, 2016.

Gómez was hospitalized on May 21, 2018 in Cupey, Puerto Rico, suffering from a pulmonary edema and pneumonia.

On March of 2022, Gomez was rescued by his wife Carolina Gamboa, son Wilfredo Jr., and by friend, fellow former world boxing champion Victor Callejas, from  his ex lover, identified as Diana Sevilla Villalobos, who apparently was holding him hostage at his Venus Gardens, Cupey (San Juan) house. Gomez was taken to a psychiatric hospital. Gomez subsequently recovered and returned to his wife by choice.

Honors
Both the Wilfredo Gómez boxing gym and the Complejo Deportivo Wilfredo Gómez (Wilfredo Gómez Sporting Complex) in Guaynabo are named after him.

Professional boxing record

See also

List of super bantamweight boxing champions
List of featherweight boxing champions
List of super featherweight boxing champions
List of WBA world champions
List of WBC world champions
List of boxing triple champions
List of Puerto Rican boxing world champions
Sports in Puerto Rico

References

External links
 
 IBHOF.com, Wilfredo Gómez Biography at the International Boxing Hall of Fame Website
 Oneeyedfilms.com, "Bazooka: The Battles of Wilfredo Gómez"
 Wilfredo Gómez – CBZ Profile

|- 

|- 

1956 births
Living people
Converts to Christianity
World Boxing Council champions
World boxing champions
Boxers at the 1972 Summer Olympics
Olympic boxers of Puerto Rico
International Boxing Hall of Fame inductees
Sportspeople from San Juan, Puerto Rico
Puerto Rican people of Spanish descent
Puerto Rican Christians
Puerto Rican male boxers
World super-featherweight boxing champions
AIBA World Boxing Championships medalists
Boxing commentators